In United States law, multidistrict litigation (MDL) refers to a special federal legal procedure designed to speed the process of handling complex cases, such as air disaster litigation or complex product liability suits.

Description
MDL cases occur when "civil actions involving one or more common questions of fact are pending in different districts." In order to efficiently process cases that could involve hundreds (or thousands) of plaintiffs in dozens of different federal courts that all share common issues, the Judicial Panel on Multidistrict Litigation (JPML) decides whether cases should be "centralized" under the MDL statute ("centralization" is the JPML's term of art for MDL transfers), and if so, where the cases should be transferred.  Cases subject to MDL are sent from one court, known as the transferor, to another, known as the transferee, for all pretrial proceedings and discovery. If a case is not settled or dismissed in the transferee court, it is remanded (that is, sent back) to the transferor court for trial.

It is common for the JPML to learn after ordering centralization of the existence of additional pending actions involving the same or similar questions of fact as the actions it had just centralized.  Either they had already been filed but the JPML was unaware of them at the time, or they were filed after centralization.  These so-called "tag-along actions" are almost always also subject to centralization once they come to the attention of the panel.

Statute
Section 1407 came about because of the first large-scale complex litigation to engulf the federal judiciary: the gigantic antitrust scandal in the U.S. electrical equipment industry in the early 1960s. The scandal resulted in the filing of 1,912 separate civil actions in district courts in 36 federal judicial districts, which together pleaded a total of 25,714 claims involving 20 product lines. In January 1962, Chief Justice Earl Warren appointed a Co-ordinating Committee for Multiple Litigation (CCML) of the United States District Courts. (The Committee's name reflects the fact that it was still commonplace at the time to include a hyphen in the word "coordinate.")  The chair of the CCML was Alfred P. Murrah, then the chief judge of the Tenth Circuit. The Committee responded to the emergency with a number of ad hoc procedures which would become commonplace in multidistrict litigation, such as consolidated national depositions and document depositories. Through aggressive case management, the CCML was able to terminate the electrical equipment litigation by March 1967; only nine cases went to trial and only five of those went to verdict. In the course of its work, the CCML discovered that complex litigation involving similar issues in multiple districts was becoming a regularly recurring problem in federal courts, and recommended the enactment of a formal statutory foundation for their management in March 1964. It was the CCML's secretary, Phil C. Neal, who first conceived of the concept now known as multidistrict litigation. This eventually led to the enactment of the MDL statute four years later and the creation of the JPML as a permanent replacement for the CCML. Besides Murrah, other key players in the legislative maneuvering that led to the enactment of the MDL statute included federal district judge William H. Becker and Senator Joseph Tydings, the chair of the Senate Judiciary Committee.

Cases

In the decades since Congress enacted the MDL statute in 1968, MDLs have evolved into the federal judiciary's primary method for managing complex civil litigation.  Once a small minority, MDLs have gradually become the dominant component of the U.S. federal civil caseload. In early 2020, the JPML published statistical data revealing that by the end of 2018, 51.9 percent of all pending federal civil cases had been centralized into MDLs. This was the first time that more than half of all federal civil cases had ended up in MDLs. In particular, "of the 301,766 civil cases pending in the federal court system at the close of 2018, 156,511 were pending in 248 MDLs."  As percentages of the total number of MDLs, the top three categories were products liability (32.9%), antitrust (24.1%), and sales practices (12.1%).  In terms of the percentage of the total number of civil cases in MDLs, products liability was overwhelmingly dominant at 91 percent.

In connection with MDLs' rise to prominence, they have become subject to widespread criticism from attorneys for both plaintiffs and defendants because they largely operate outside of the traditional civil procedure framework established by the Federal Rules of Civil Procedure (FRCP).  In other words, over half of American federal civil actions are no longer actually litigated under the rules taught in American law schools, as the MDL procedure has evolved from a "pretrial management tool toward an alternative dispute resolution medium setting the table for global settlements."

Most MDLs involve a few dozen to a few hundred cases.  The notable exception is MDL No. 875, based in the Eastern District of Pennsylvania, which is the largest and longest-lasting MDL. It was created in 1991 by the JPML to manage all asbestos personal injury and wrongful death cases in the federal courts. As of 2011, over 121,000 cases had been transferred into MDL No. 875, and over 108,000 cases had been settled, dismissed, or remanded, leaving about 13,000 pending.

One controversial aspect of MDLs is that the MDL statute does not grant the transferee court any discretion as to remand for trial, even when both courts would prefer to keep the case in the transferee court for trial. After all, by the time a case reaches the trial stage, the transferee has become intimately familiar with the issues, the parties, and their attorneys (because the transferee court will normally have decided one or more motions for summary judgment at that point), while the transferor court must spend time catching up on what happened while the case was away in the MDL.  

The MDL statute had always been intended to cover only pretrial proceedings.  But as soon as Section 1407 was enacted in 1968, federal courts began to hold that the transferee court had the power to transfer a case to itself for all purposes—including trial—a so-called "self-transfer".  The JPML recognized the existence of the self-transfer procedure as early as 1972, and eventually endorsed that practice in its rules. In 1998, however, the U.S. Supreme Court brought self-transfers to a halt by ruling that the plain language of the MDL statute required remand back to the transferor for trial, and invalidated the JPML's rule.  The primary exception to the rule against self-transfers is that the parties can voluntarily consent to keep a case in the transferee court for trial.

State law
When state law cases filed in federal court under diversity jurisdiction are consolidated into MDLs, the Erie doctrine comes into play and confronts federal district judges with some of the most difficult, multilayered legal questions they will ever see in their careers.  The problem is that when sitting in diversity and asked to decide dispositive pretrial motions like the motion for summary judgment, the transferee court must apply the law of the state of the transferor court, which could be located anywhere in the United States.  But in complex product liability cases such as airplane crashes, the victims might not even be American citizens and the plaintiffs' losses may not even have occurred within the borders of the United States, and of course, every U.S. state has its own choice-of-law rules.  The result is that a MDL judge often has to sort through the laws of two, three, or four separate jurisdictions, none of which may be the state which the transferee court sits in, just to determine whether a plaintiff has a viable cause of action.  Naturally, the lawyers in the proceeding must first educate themselves and the judge about the relevant laws from all those jurisdictions.

As of 2008, the District of Minnesota was the busiest district for MDL cases, with 9 active MDL cases pending as of December 2011.

State courts

As one expert has noted, "perhaps the most serious limitation" of the MDL statute is that the JPML "has no authority over actions pending in state courts".  This arises from a fundamental limitation of federal courts: they are courts of limited jurisdiction under the federal Constitution and lack the general jurisdiction of state courts.  Congress has partially addressed this problem by making it easier to remove certain types of actions from state courts to federal courts (e.g., the Class Action Fairness Act of 2005), but has not been able (and is probably unable under the current Constitution) to enact a statute granting plenary jurisdiction to the JPML to implement pretrial coordination and consolidation between federal and state courts. 

In the absence of federal guidance, state courts have developed several different approaches to intrastate pretrial coordination and consolidation of civil actions pending in different trial courts that share common questions of fact.  A 2021 article found that as of that year, twenty-six states appear to have no approach at all; thirteen states have developed formal mechanisms either modeled after or roughly analogous to the MDL statute; seven states have procedures allowing for the affected trial court judges to coordinate with each other; and four states have a history of ad hoc consolidation but no formal mechanism in place.  

There is much diversity among the states that have some form of MDL procedure.  Only Colorado, New York, Texas, and West Virginia follow the federal model of maintaining a standing panel of judges to handle centralization issues.  Only Kansas, New York, and Texas follow the federal rule that transfer is solely for pretrial proceedings and cases must be remanded back to transferor courts for trial. As for the other states with a MDL-like procedure, the general rule is that transfer is for all purposes including trial, and centralization issues are handled either by the state supreme court sitting en banc, the chief justice of the state (acting alone or on the recommendation of another judge), or an ad hoc panel.

Footnotes

Law of the United States
United States civil procedure
Jurisdiction
Diversity jurisdiction case law